The County Chairman is a lost 1914 silent film drama directed by Allan Dwan, produced by the Famous Players Film Company and distributed through Paramount Pictures. It is based on the 1903 stage play by George Ade that starred Maclyn Arbuckle, who reprises his role in this film. Also starring alongside Arbuckle is up-and-coming heartthrob Harold Lockwood. The story is typical of the stage plays (and its star) Adolph Zukor brought to films for his Famous Players Company in its earliest years. This film was remade by Fox in 1935 with Will Rogers.

Cast
Maclyn Arbuckle - The Honorable Jim Hackler, The County Chairman (*Arbuckle's role in 1903 play)
Harold Lockwood - Tillford Wheeler
Willis P. Sweatnam - Sassafras Livingston (*Sweatnam's role in 1903 play)
William Lloyd - Elias Rigby
Daisy Jefferson - Lucy Rigby
Helen Aubrey - Mrs. Rigby
Mabel Wilbur - Lorena Watkins
Wellington A. Playter - Joseph Whitaker

unbilled
Amy Summers - Chick

References

External links

1914 films
American silent feature films
American films based on plays
Films directed by Allan Dwan
Lost American films
Silent American drama films
1914 drama films
American black-and-white films
1914 lost films
Lost drama films
1910s American films